Dirty Weekend is a 1973 Italian comedy film directed by Dino Risi.

Cast
 Marcello Mastroianni as Giulio Borsi
 Oliver Reed as Fabrizo
 Carole André as Danda
 Lionel Stander as General
 Bruno Cirino as Raoul
 Nicoletta Machiavelli as Sylva
 Gianni Agus as Sergio
 Marcello Mando as Kommissar Spallone
 Renzo Marignano as Franco
 Barbara Pilavin as Norma

Release
Dirty Weekend was released theatrically in Italy where it was distributed by Cineriz. The film grossed a total of 303.187 million Italian lira on its release. The film was later shown in Paris on 2 October 1974 under the title Rapt a l'italienne with a 100-minute running time.

Footnotes

References

External links

1973 films
1973 comedy films
1970s Italian-language films
French comedy films
Films directed by Dino Risi
Commedia all'italiana
Films produced by Carlo Ponti
Films scored by Carlo Rustichelli
Films with screenplays by Ruggero Maccari
1970s Italian films
1970s French films